Erec Stebbins, Ph.D., (born 1969) is an American biomedical scientist and novelist. Head of Rockefeller University's Laboratory of Structural Microbiology from 2001 to 2016 and currently Head of Division of Structural Biology of Infection and Immunity at the German Cancer Research Center, he is known for his contributions to the fields of cancer research and infectious disease, studying the structure of disease-related proteins through the technique of X-ray crystallography. He is a published academic writer and has been cited by his peers for his work in cancer research and infectious disease. He is also a novelist and author of science fiction (Daughter of Time Trilogy) and thrillers (The Ragnarök Conspiracy, Extraordinary Retribution).

Biography

Stebbins was born Charles Erec Stebbins on December 5, 1969. He received his B.A. from Oberlin College in 1992 and his Ph.D. from the Weill Cornell Graduate School of Medical Sciences in 1999. His Ph.D. thesis was titled  Structural Studies of the von Hippel-Lindau Tumor Suppressor and the Oncogene Chaperone Hsp90, completed in the laboratory of Nikola Pavletich. He conducted postdoctoral studies in microbiology in the laboratory of Jorge Galán at Yale University from 1999 to 2001. In 2001, he was hired as an assistant professor and made the Head of Laboratory of Structural Microbiology at the Rockefeller University. In 2006, he was promoted to Associate Professor. He is currently Head of the Division of Structural Biology of Infection and Immunity at the German Cancer Research Center. His work has been profiled in the lay press at The New York Times.

In 2012, with the Prometheus Books imprint Seventh Street Books, Stebbins published The Ragnarök Conspiracy, a contemporary thriller centered on a plot by terrorists to instigate a global war between Western and Islamic nations. Stebbins has said that his debut novel was inspired by his witnessing the September 11 attacks while he lived in New York City.

Select publications

Awards
2008 EUREKA
2004 ICAAC Young Investigator Award
2003	 NYSTAR James Watson Investigator
2000	 Molecular Structure Corporation Future Investigator Award
1999 Julian R. Rachele Prize, Weill Graduate School of Medical Sciences of Cornell University

Personal life

Stebbins is married and has three children. He resides in Heidelberg.

References

External links
Author Website
German Cancer Research Center (DKFZ): Stebbins Web Page

Living people
1969 births
American microbiologists
Oberlin College alumni
Rockefeller University faculty
Cornell University alumni